Rajesh Joshi (31 July 1968 – 12 January 1998) was an Indian film and theater actor known for his roles in films such as Rangeela (Pakya) and Sarfarosh (Bala Thakur).

He was injured in a car crash on 11 January 1998 and died the next day, aged 29. Satya was his last movie, the credits name him as "late". Joshi was the younger brother of actor Manoj Joshi.

Filmography
 Rangeela (1995) as Pakya
 Tere Mere Sapne (1996) as Astrologer
 Aflatoon (1997) as Akshay's Friend
 Satya (1998) as Bapu
 Sarfarosh (1999) as Bala Thakur
 Lawaaris (1999)
Khauff (2000)

References

External links
 
 Rajesh Joshi at Bollywood Hungama
 Underrated Brothers & Tribute to Rajesh Joshi, 25 March 2009

Indian male film actors
Male actors in Hindi cinema
1968 births
1998 deaths
Indian male stage actors
Road incident deaths in India
20th-century Indian male actors